Robati-ye Shazdeh may refer to:
 Robati Gharbatha
 Robat-e Sar Push